Raleigh City Council is the governing body for the city of Raleigh, the state capital of North Carolina.

Raleigh is governed by council-manager government.  It is composed of eight members, including the Mayor of Raleigh. Five of the members are elected from the five districts that cover the city.  The remaining three, including the mayor, are elected at-large.  They are all elected every two years. The new council is installed in early December.

Current members, 2022-2024 Term 

 Mary-Ann Baldwin, Mayor
 Jonathan Melton, at-large
 Stormie Forte, at-large
 Mary Black-Branch, District A
 Megan Patton, District B 
 Corey Branch, District C
 Jane Harrison, District D
 Christina Jones, District E

Notable former members

Ralph Campbell (1985–1991)
Janet Cowell (2001–2004)
Jesse Helms (1957–1961)
Neal Hunt (2001–2004)
Eric Miller Reeves (1993–1996)
Saige Martin (2019-2020)

Previous Raleigh City Councils
1947 – 1949
 P. D. Snipes, Mayor
 Miss Ruth Wilson
 Fred B. Wheeler
 Hobson I. Gattis
 John F. Danielson
 Fred Fletcher
 Joe S. Correll

1949 – 1951

 P. D. Snipes, Mayor
 James E. Briggs, Mayor Pro Tem
 Miss Ruth Wilson
 Joe S. Correll
 John F. Danielson
 Hobson I. Gattis
 Fred B. Wheeler

1951 – 1953

 James E. Briggs, Mayor
 Fred B. Wheeler, Mayor Pro Tem, Chairman of Law & Finance Committee
 B. B. Benson
 John F. Danielson, Chairman of Public Works Committee
 W. W. Merriman, Jr.
 W. D. Martin, Sr.
 Martin K. Green

1953 – 1955

 Fred B. Wheeler, Mayor
 John F. Danielson, Chairman of Public Works Committee
 B. B. Benson, Mayor Pro Tem
 W. D. Debnam
 William G. Enloe, Chairman of Law & Finance Committee
 Martin K. Green
 W. D. Martin, Sr.

1955 – 1957

 Fred B. Wheeler, Mayor
 John F. Danielson, Mayor Pro Tem, Chairman of Public Works Committee
 W. E. Debnam (resigned 7/20/57 – Wade Lewis appointed)
 Charles W. Bradshaw
 Martin K. Green
 Frank M. Jolly
 William G. Enloe, Chairman of Law & Finance Committee

1957 – 1959

 Wililam G. Enloe, Mayor
 Guy W. Rawls, Mayor Pro Tem
 John N. Coffey, Chairman of Public Works Committee at death of Fred B. Wheeler
 Joe S. Correll
 Jesse Helms, Chairman of Law & Finance Committee
 James D. Ray, Jr.
 Fred D. Wheeler (died in office 12/11/57 – John E.Treadwell appointed)
 
1959 – 1961

 William G. Enloe, Mayor
 James W. Reid, Mayor Pro Tem
 John N. Coffee, Chairman of Public Works Committee
 Joe S. Correll
 Jesse Helms, Chairman of Law & Finance Committee
 Robert S. Sessoms, Jr.
 Paul A. Hoover

1961 – 1963

 Wiliam G. Enloe, Mayor
 James W. Reid, Mayor Pro Tem
 John N. Coffee, Chairman of Public Works Committee
 Paul A. Hoover, Chairman of Law & Finance Committee
 William L. McLaurin
 Travis H. Tomlinson
 John W. Winters

1963 – 1965

 James W. Reid, Mayor
 Wiliam L. McLaurin, Mayor Pro Tem
 Earl H. Hostetler
 William H. Worth
 Travis H. Tomlinson, Chairman of Law & Finance Committee
 John Winters, Chairman of Public Works and Planning Commission
 Charles W. Gaddy

1965 – 1967

 Travis H. Tomlinson, Mayor
 William L. McLaurin, Mayor Pro Tem
 Earl H. Hostetler
 William H. Worth
 John W. Winters
 Charles W. Gaddy
 William M. Law

1967 – 1969

 Travis H. Tomlinson, Mayor
 Earl H. Hostetler, Mayor Pro Tem
 Clarence E. Lightner
 William H. Worth
 William M. Law
 Seby B. Jones
 George B. Cherry

1969 – 1971

 Seby B. Jones, Mayor
 George B. Cherry, Mayor Pro Tem
 Clarence E. Lightner
 Jesse O. Sanderson
 Thomas W. Bradshaw
 A. L. Strickland
 Robert W. Shoffner

1971 – 1973

 Thomas W. Bradshaw, Jr. – Mayor
 Clarence E. Lightner, Mayor Pro Tem
 Michael Boyd
 Jesse O. Sanderson (resigned 2/29/73 – Paul Hoover appointed)
 William G. Enloe (died 11/22/72 – Edith Reid appointed)
 A. L. Strickland
 Robert W. Shoffner

1973 – 1975

 Clarence E. Lightner, Mayor
 Jack B. Keeter, Mayor Pro Tem
 Ronald I. Kirshbaum
 Thomas G. Bashford
 Miriam P. Block
 William R. Knight
 James T. Quinn
 J. Oliver Wililams

1975 – 1977

 Jyles J. Coggins, Mayor
 Jack B. Keeter, Mayor Pro Tem
 Ronald I. Kirschbaum
 Thomas G. Bashford
 Miriam P. Block
 Randolph T. Hester, Jr.
 William R. Knight
 James T. Quinn

1977 – 1979

 Isabella W. Cannon, Mayor
 Jack B. Keeter, Mayor Pro Tem (died 12/2/78 – James B. Womble appointed)
 Miriam P. Block
 William R. Knight
 Edward A. Walters
 William H. Wilson
 George Smedes York
 S. Tony Jordan

1979 – 1981

 G. Smedes York, Mayor
 Edward A. Walters, Mayor
 James B. Womble
 Miriam P. Block
 John A. Edwards, Jr.
 Arthur J. Calloway
 S. Tony Jordan
 Avery C. Upchurch

1981 - 1983

 G. Smedes York, Mayor
 Edwards A. Walters, Mayor Pro Tem
 Sandra P. Babb
 Walter M. Keller
 John A. Edwards, Jr.
 Arthur J. Calloway
 S. Tony Jordan
 Avery C. Upchurch

1983 – 1985

 Avery C. Upchurch, Mayor
 Edward A. Walters, Mayor Pro Tem
 Sandra P. Babb
 Walter M. Keller
 Miriam P. Block
 Arthur J. Calloway
 Mary C. Cates
 O. Morton Congleton

1985 – 1987

 Avery C. Upchurch, Mayor
 Edward A. Walters, Mayor Pro Tem
 Mary C. Cates
 O. Morton Congleton
 Perry Safran
 Charles C. Meeker
 Ralph Campbell, Jr.
 Norma DeCamp Burns

1987 – 1989

 Avery C. Upchurch, Mayor
 Mary C. Cates, Mayor Pro Tem
 Charles C. Meeker
 Ralph Campbell, Jr.
 Norma DeCamp Burns
 Geoffrey Elting
 Anne S. Franklin
 Mary Watson Nooe

1989 – 1991

 Avery C. Upchurch, Mayor
 Ralph Campbell, Jr., Mayor Pro Tem
 Mary C. Cates
 Anne S. Franklin
 Mary Watson Nooe
 Frank L. Turner
 E. Julian Ford
 J. Barlow Herget

1991 – 1993

 Avery C. Upchurch, Mayor
 Anne S. Franklin, Mayor Pro Tem
 Mary C. Cates
 Mary Watson Nooe
 Ralph Campbell, Jr.  (elected State Auditor – Charles Francis appointed)
 Charles C. Meeker
 Geoffrey Elting
 J. Barlow Hergett

1993 – 1995

 Tom Fetzer, Mayor
 Mary Watson Nooe, Mayor Pro Tem
 Charles C. Meeker
 Geoff Elting
 John H. Odom
 Brad Thompson
 Eric Reeves
 Paul Y. Coble

1995 - 1997

 Tom Fetzer, Mayor
 Julie Shea Graw
 Marc Scruggs
 Kieran Joseph Shanahan
 John H. Odom
 Brad Thompson
 Eric Reeves (elected to State House of Representatives 12-96 – Stacy Miller app’t 1-97)
 Paul Y. Coble
 
1997 – 1999

 Tom Fetzer, Mayor
 Julie Shea Graw
 Stephanie Fanjul
 Kieran Joseph Shanahan
 John H. Odom
 Brad Thompson
 W. Benson Kirkman
 Paul Y. Coble

1999 – 2001

 Paul Y. Coble, Mayor
 John H. Odom, Mayor Pro Tem
 Julie Shea Graw
 O. Morton Congleton
 Kieran Joseph Shanahan
 James West
 W. Benson Kirkman
 Marc Scruggs

2001 – 2003

 Charles C. Meeker, Mayor
 W. Benson Kirkman, Deputy Mayor
 John H. Odom, Deputy Mayor
 Janet R. Cowell
 K. Neal Hunt
 Philip R. Isley
 Kieran Joseph Shanahan
 James P. West

2003 – 2005

 Charles C. Meeker, Mayor
 James P. West, Mayor Pro Tem – District C
 Janet Cowell replaced by Joyce Kekas 2/1/05 -Cowell elected to NC Senate - At Large
 Neal K. Hunt replaced by Tommy Craven 2/1/05 – Hunt elected to NC Senate- At Large
 Mike Regan – District A
 Jessie Taliaferro – District B
 Thomas Crowder – District D
 Philip Isley – District E

2005 – 2007

 Charles C. Meeker
 Russ Stephenson – At Large
 Joyce Kekas – At Large
 Thomas Craven – District A
 Jessie Taliaferro – District B
 James P. West – District C – Mayor Pro Tem
 Thomas G. Crowder – District D
 Philip Randolph Isley – District E

2007 – 2009

 Charles C. Meeker, Mayor
 James P. West, Mayor Pro Tem -  District C
 Mary Ann Baldwin – At Large
 Russ Stephenson – At Large
 Nancy McFarlane – District A
 Rodger Koopman - District B
 Thomas G. Crowder – District D
 Philip R. Isley – District E

2009 – 2011

 Charles C. Meeker – Mayor
 James P. West, Mayor Pro Tem – District C (Resigned to become Wake County Commissioner 9/21/10)
 Mary-Ann Baldwin – At Large (Mayor Pro Tem 10/19/10 – 4/30/11)
 Russ Stephenson – At Large
 Nancy McFarlane – District A (Mayor Pro Tem 5/1/11 – 12/5/11)
 John Odom – District B
 Eugene Weeks – District C (October 19, 2010)
 Thomas G. Crowder – District D
 Bonner Gaylord – District E

2011 – 2013
 Nancy McFarlane – Mayor
 Russ Stephenson – At Large; Mayor Pro Tem 12/6/11 – 12/03/12
 Eugene Weeks – District C; Mayor Pro Tem 12/04/12 – 12/03/13
 Mary-Ann Baldwin – At Large 
 Randall Stagner – District A
 John Odom – District B
 Thomas Crowder – District D
 Bonner Gaylord – District E

2013 – 2015

 Nancy McFarlane – Mayor
 Mary-Ann Baldwin – At-Large
 Russ Stephenson – At-Large
 Wayne Maiorano – District A
 John Odom – District B
 Eugene Weeks – District C
 Thomas Crowder – District D
 Bonner Gaylord – District E

2015-2017

 Nancy McFarlane – Mayor
 Mary-Ann Baldwin – At-Large
 Russ Stephenson – At-Large
 Dickie Thompson – District A
 David Cox  – District B
 Corey Branch – District C
 Kay Crowder – District D
 Bonner Gaylord – District E

2017-2019

 Nancy McFarlane (Mayor)
 Nicole Stewart (at-large)
 Russ Stephenson (at-large)
 Dickie Thompson (District A)
 David Cox (District B)
 Corey Branch (District C)
 Kay Crowder (District D)
 Stef Mendell (District E)

References

City Council
North Carolina city councils